Alan G. Morrow (born 29 November 1936) is a former Australian rules footballer in the VFL.

A hard working tough ruckman who took on a ruck role when Carl Ditterich missed the 1966 Grand Final due to suspension. St Kilda controversially recruited Morrow and Bill Stephenson from Sale, illegally offering money.

Morrow was injured early in the 1965 Grand Final, the favoured Saints losing the match in part due to missing Morrow. The Grand Final win in 1966 was his last VFL game.

Morrow moved to Dandenong in the Victorian Football Association in 1967 as captain-coach, and led Dandenong to its first Division 1 premiership that season.

See also
 1967 VFA Grand Final

References

External links 
St Kilda Hall of Fame Profile

1936 births
Living people
St Kilda Football Club players
St Kilda Football Club Premiership players
Dandenong Football Club players
Dandenong Football Club coaches
Sale Football Club players
Australian rules footballers from Victoria (Australia)
One-time VFL/AFL Premiership players